Magnus den store is a Magnus Uggla live album, released in 2013. It was released on 27 February 2013.

Track listing
Stäng av mobilen
Jag är jag
Nallebjörn
Vill inte ha dig
Tick tack
Alla flickor visslar
Leva med min afro
Århundradets fest
Finalen
Montezumas hämnd
På egen hand
Jag och min far
Tycker om dig (Finalmente)
Har hört om en tjej (I Heard of a Girl)
Jag skiter i Amerika (Living in America)
Försvinn ur mitt liv (You're out of My Life)
Vandrar i ett regn

Charts

References 

2013 live albums
Magnus Uggla albums
Swedish-language live albums